Q30 may refer to:
 Q30 (New York City bus)
 Ar-Rum, the 30th surah of the Quran
 , a Naïade-class submarinev
 Infiniti Q30, an automobile
 Q30 Television, at Quinnipiac University